Ameal is a former civil parish in the municipality of Coimbra, Portugal. The population in 2011 was 1,682, in an area of 11.25 km2. On 28 January 2013 it merged with Taveiro and Arzila to form Taveiro, Ameal e Arzila.

See also 

 Count of Ameal

References 

Former parishes of Coimbra